Nomismatokopio is a station on Athens Metro Line 3. It opened on 2 September 2009.

Station layout

References

Athens Metro stations
Railway stations opened in 2009
2009 establishments in Greece